Hi-5 was a Greek pop girl group formed in Athens in 2003 through the Greek version of the reality TV show Popstars. The group consisted of Marlain Angelides, Frosso Papacharalambous, Nancy Stergiopoulou, Irini Psixrami and Shaya. The band had a large fanbase in Greece and Cyprus. They disbanded in March 2005.

History
Hi-5 had been created in 2003 and consisted of Marlain Angelides, Frosso Papacharalambous, Nancy Stergiopoulou, Irini Psixrami and Shaya, who were the winners of the Greek version of the popular talent show Popstars. The band released more than five chart-topping singles over the course of one year.

Their debut single "Ksero ti Zitaw" was released by Warner in the spring of 2003 and was later certified gold that June. The single went Gold and enjoyed heavy radio and television airplay. Hi5 were able to sustain their commercial success by releasing the song "To Tixero Asteri" which also reached the top of the airplay charts, furthering the band's mainstream exposure. The success of those singles was accompanied by the release of Hi-5's debut self-titled studio album, which also reached number one in Greece, eventually reaching Platinum status for shipments of over 40,000 copies. The longevity of the album in the charts was supported by the commercial success of its third single, "Allo Agapi Ke Allo Sex". That single was able to replicate the success of the two previous singles, enjoying massive airplay thanks to the controversial and suggestive nature of its lyrics and the catchiness of its melody. By the end of the year, Hi5 received various awards from MAD channel and other shows because of their phenomenal success. In the Christmas season of 2003, the band also released a Christmas album, which was certified Gold partially thanks to the success of its single "Agnosto Paidi Tou Kosmou".

In 2004, the band released their third studio album, which enjoyed great initial success. The lead single "Genithika Ksana" peaked at number one in the Greek singles chart, while also receiving heavy airplay. The album followed suit, debuting at number one, while going Gold. However, the success of this album was short-lived. Specifically, the band faced a backlash after a live performance during which they were booed. During the same live performance a part of the audience threw yogurt at Hi-5. This event was widely reported by the Greek media. The deteriorating popularity of the band following this event led to numerous fights between the band members, which led to their decisive breakup by the end of 2004.

Furthermore, their song Lathos I Sosto was chosen to be played in the Billboard radio during the summer of 2003. Their third and last studio album, entitled Makria Apo Afti ti Gi, was released in June 2004. Hi-5 disbanded in February 2005, after a fight and the closing down of their record company, the Greek repertoire division of Warner Music Greece. All of the band's members, except Papacharalambous, who had returned to her homeland of Cyprus in order to finish her studies, pursued solo careers. Angelidou got the main role of the musical Saturday Night Fever, Psixrami worked in bars performing rock songs, Shaya worked in a nightclub and Stergiopoulou also worked in a nightclub alongside Greek singer Thanos Petrelis. There are unconfirmed rumors that Angelides, Psixrami and Stergiopoulou are working on their debut solo studio albums. Following the band's disband, Shaya had been featured in songs by multiple recording artists and has released her debut single as a solo singer in 2010.

Discography
Studio albums

 Hi-5 (2003)
 Mia Nichta San ki Afti (2003)
 Makria Apo Afti ti Gi (2004)

CD singles

 "Xero Ti Zitao" (2003)
 "Tichero Asteri" (2003)
 "Allo Agapi Allo Sex/Me Ena Fili" (2003)
 "Agnosto Pedi tou Kosmou" (2003)
 "Gennithika Xana/To Be With You" (2004)
 "Tipota/Skepsou" (2005)

Awards and nominations

References

Greek pop music groups
Girl groups
MAD Video Music Awards winners
Musical groups from Athens